Logoualé is a town in western Ivory Coast. It is a sub-prefecture and commune of Man Department in Tonkpi Region, Montagnes District.

In 2021, the population of the sub-prefecture of Logoualé was 32,854.

Villages
The fifteen villages of the sub-prefecture of Logoualé and their population in 2014 are:

Notes

Sub-prefectures of Tonkpi
Communes of Tonkpi